MaryAnn Eaddy Black (October 3, 1943 – March 25, 2020) was an American clinical social worker and politician.

Black was born in Manhattan in New York City, New York. She moved with her family to Florence, South Carolina, and graduated from Wilson High School. She received her bachelor's degree in English from Benedict College and master's degree in social work from University of North Carolina at Chapel Hill. Black lived in Durham, North Carolina, and was a clinical social worker. Black served on the Durham County Board of Commissioners from 1990 to 2002 and was chair of the county board (1996-2002).

In 2017, Black was appointed as a Democrat to the North Carolina House of Representatives by governor Roy Cooper and served until her death in 2020 at age 76. She was not seeking re-election to the North Carolina General Assembly. Black was undergoing treatment for cancer when she died her home in Durham, North Carolina, on March 25, 2020.

Notes

External links

1943 births
2020 deaths
People from Florence, South Carolina
Politicians from Durham, North Carolina
Politicians from Manhattan
Benedict College alumni
UNC School of Social Work alumni
American social workers
Women state legislators in North Carolina
County commissioners in North Carolina
Democratic Party members of the North Carolina House of Representatives
Deaths from cancer in North Carolina
21st-century American women